Xeno is a 1986 video game for the ZX Spectrum, Amstrad CPC and Commodore 64 in which players take turns attempting to knock a ball between two goal posts.

References

External links 

Xeno on the Amstrad CPC

1986 video games
Action video games
Air hockey video games
Fantasy sports video games
Video games developed in the United Kingdom
ZX Spectrum games
Amstrad CPC games
Commodore 64 games
Multiplayer video games
Vehicular combat games
Binary Design games